R. Rajendran is an Indian politician and was a member of the Tamil Nadu Legislative Assembly from the Kurinjipadi constituency. He represents the Anna Dravida Munnetra Kazhagam party.

References

Tamil Nadu MLAs 2011–2016
All India Anna Dravida Munnetra Kazhagam politicians
Living people
Year of birth missing (living people)
Place of birth missing (living people)